As’ad Madani (27 April 1928 – 6 February 2006) was an Indian Deobandi Islamic scholar and a politician, who served as the sixth general secretary and the seventh President of the Jamiat Ulema-e-Hind. He was a member of the executive body of Darul Uloom Deoband. He was a member of the Rajya Sabha, upper house of the Parliament of India representing Uttar Pradesh for three terms as a member of the Indian National Congress.

Early life and education
Asad Madni was born in 1928 to Hussain Ahmad Madni in Moradabad at his maternal uncle's home. He was raised in Madani Manzil in Deoband. He graduated from Darul Uloom Deoband in 1945. He then stayed in Madinah for a few years before returning as teacher at Darul Uloom Deoband for 12 years.

Career
In 1960, he was appointed as the president of the Uttar Pradesh circle of Jamiat Ulama-e-Hind and on 9 August 1963, he was appointed as the general secretary of the Jamiat Ulama-e-Hind. He became the president of Jamiat Ulama-e-Hind on 11 August 1973.
He was president of Jamiat Ulama-e-Hind for 32 years. He was a member of the upper house of the Indian parliament from 1968 to 1974, 1980 to 1986 and 1988 to 1994.

Death and legacy

On 6 February 2006, Madani died in Delhi, India.
He is survived by his son Mahmood Madani who is General secretary of one faction of the Jamiat Ulama-e-Hind.

An international seminar was organized in his memory in New Delhi on 23 and 24 April 2007.  Madani's parliamentary speeches were released by the former Prime Minister of India Manmohan Singh in the same seminar.

He is a very popular figure in the neighbouring country of Bangladesh which he frequently used to visit. He first visited eastern Bengal in 1933, and since 1973 he used to go there nearly every year. During the Bangladesh Liberation War of 1971, Madni strongly protested against the brutal torture of the Pakistan Army and its allied forces, and distributed adequate aid to the memorial camps. He projected his views to stop the torture of innocent Bengalis and marched in the streets of Delhi with more than fifty thousand Indian Muslims in favour of Bangladesh. His last visit to the country was on 2 April 2005 when he was an honorary guest at the National Conference of Jamiat Ulema-e-Islam Bangladesh at Paltan Maidan, Dhaka.

References

Bibliography
 

20th-century Muslim scholars of Islam
Indian Sunni Muslim scholars of Islam
1928 births
2006 deaths
Deobandis
People from Deoband
Indian religious leaders
Rajya Sabha members from Uttar Pradesh
Presidents of Jamiat Ulama-e-Hind
Burials at Mazar-e-Qasmi
Disciples of Hussain Ahmad Madani